Hlybokaye or Glubokoye is a town in Vitebsk Region, Belarus, and the administrative center of Hlybokaye District. The city is located on the international road from Polotsk to Vilnius with the historic railway line to Woropajewo (Варапаева) completed in 1932 in the interwar Poland (the town was incorporated in 1940 by the Soviet Union after the 1939 invasion of Poland). It has 18,200 inhabitants as of 2010.

Within the city limits there are two smaller lakes: Kahalnaye (Кагальнае) and Grand (Вялікае) from which the Birchwood river originates (Бярозаўка, Brzozówka in Polish). The first written records about the settlement date back to 1514. During World War II in occupied Poland the town's district of Berezwecz was the location of a massacre of up to 2,000–3,000 Polish prisoners by the Soviet NKVD secret police, and during the Nazi occupation from July 1941 to July 1944 several thousand Jews were murdered.  As late as 2009 the remains of more than 20 victims probably shot by NKVD after the takeover of the area from Poland were again discovered in a basement of a local church.

History
The first mention of Hlybokaye in historical sources comes from 1414, and this date is considered as the year it was founded. In 1514, Hlybokaye was included in the documents of the Grand Duchy of Lithuania as consisting of a manor house and a property owned by Zianowicz family. Jews first settled in Hlybokaye during the 17th century, and by the end of the 19th century represented about 70% of the town's 5,600 residents.

Second Polish Republic
During Polish-Soviet War of independence, Hlybokaye was taken over by the Polish Army in December 1919, but in July 1920 found itself in the hands of the Bolsheviks as a result of the offensive by Mikhail Tukhachevsky. On 5 July 1920, near Hlybokaye there was a battle in which some 1,500 soldiers died on both sides. In October 1920, the Poles regained the city. The incorporation of Hlybokaye into the Second Polish Republic was officially confirmed by the 1921 Treaty of Riga signed between Poland and the Soviet Union. It was given town status and became the administrative center of the Dziśnieński–Głębokie district and the seat of municipality. On 19 February 1921, Hlybokaye became part of Nowogródek Voivodeship (1919–39), from 13 April 1922, part of Ziemia Wileńska region, and on 20 January 1926 part of Wilno Voivodeship (1926–39). On 10 November 1933, the settlement of Gliniszcza was included within the boundaries of Hlybokaye.

According to the Polish census of 1921, some 2,844 Jews lived in Hlybokaye, accounting for 63% of its population. Just before the Soviet invasion of Poland in World War II, Hlybokaye had a population of 9,700. Most residents worked in either, confectionery factory, tannery, mill, county administration, private shops, and warehouses. Every Thursday market was held in the town's centre, and four times a year - country fairs. Also in the town stationed the Polish Border Protection Corps (KOP) regiment.

World War II and later
As a result of the Soviet invasion of Poland beginning 17 September 1939, the town was overrun by the Red Army and on 2 November 1939, incorporated into the Byelorussian SSR of the Soviet Union. It became part of the brand new Vileyka Voblast on 4 December 1939. Hundreds of Poles were arrested by the NKVD and imprisoned on trumped-up charges.  Following the start of Operation Barbarossa on 22 June 1941, the NKVD murdered 1,000-2,000 prisoners, mostly Polish nationals, near Hlybokaye.

Hlybokaye fell under German occupation on 2 July 1941. Shortly thereafter the Germans enacted a number of anti-Jewish laws, including the mandating of the seizure of personal property, and established a Judenrat.  The Jews of Hlybokaye were relocated into a ghetto on 22 October 1941. Mass killings of Jews began around this time and continued during the German occupation. The largest such event occurred on 19 June 1942, when the Germans, with the help of local collaborators, murdered 2,200 Jews.  During this time Jews from neighboring communities were resettled in the Hlybokaye ghetto, such that the population grew to around 4,000 by the summer of 1943.  The Germans began to liquidate the ghetto on 19 August 1943, at which time the inhabitants were told that they were to be sent to the Majdanek concentration camp.  In response, an uprising broke out in Hlybokaye organized by Jewish anti-Nazi insurgents, which was suppressed by German artillery and air support, including the use of incendiaries that set the town on fire and led to many casualties.

At the local Catholic cemetery, there are graves of both parents of the famous Polish writer Tadeusz Dołęga-Mostowicz, his father Stefan and mother Stanisława née Popowicz. In 1998, on the back wall of the house (now courthouse) which once belonged to Mostowicz family, a bilingual plaque was laid commemorating the writer.

In July 2009, in the Orthodox Nativity of the Blessed Virgin Mary the council during a work order found the remains faithful to the Poles. Screening is conducted, and the bones were buried, officially because of the odor.

The flag and coat of arms
Hlybokaye's flag and coat of arms were established on 20 January 2006 by Belarusian presidential ukase No. 36

Monuments
 Birth of the Virgin Cathedral - were dedicated to the church of the Discalced Carmelites. Assumption of the Blessed Virgin Mary (1730-1735).
 Church of Sts. Trinity in the Głębokie - the Catholic Church, the parish of the Holy Trinity was founded by Joseph Korsak governor in 1628. Church of St. Trinity is one of the few in what is now Belarus active continuously since the foundation.
 Church and Basilian Monastery in Berezwecz - Annexed into Hlybokaye under Soviet rule. Founded in 1637 by Joseph Korsak. Initially, built of wood, exposed brick in the years 1756–1767. Basilian Order scrapped in 1839, the monastery in the second half of the nineteenth century turned into an Orthodox monastery. Between the Catholic Church restored convent and monastery KOP placed. In September 1939, the NKVD in the prison set up rooms for Poles. Preserved monastic body. Pobazyliański Church, a beautiful example of baroque Vilnius, destroyed in 1970, the order of the local authorities. The remains of the Basilian monastery building is now in prison.
 Chapel Cemetery on "Kopciówce" - p. St. Elijah (seventeenth century) - the foundation of Joseph Korsak. Took care of the temple of the Carmelites (hence the call took St. Elias, the founder of the Order of Hermits of Mount Carmel). Approx. 1775 - reconstruction of the temple. In 1865 - taken to the church, 1921 - recovery of the Catholic chapel, known then as the church rector, "school" church. Sacred Heart of Jesus in the cemetery, 1928-1938 - Fr. Kazimierz Mirynowski (CAT). 1932 - Renovation of the temple, 1938 - rector of the church, Fr. Mirynowski also served chapels and Koraby Soroka. Currently unused.
 Buildings in Zakopane, the years 1920–1930. The city was built or rebuilt six houses in Zakopane style. They are on the streets Free and Komsomolskaya (former Narutowicza). Identical Braslav also built and Szarkowszczyźnie. All the houses were covered with metal roofing. The complex also been planted larches.

Destroyed monuments
 Radziwill Palace — Model year - after 1700. Lost - August 2005. In the place of the historic monument, with the permission of the authorities, built the store.
 Orthodox church. Trinity — Model year - XVII. Destroyed - 1880.
 Synagogue — built - about XVIII. Destroyed - after 1941.

Cemeteries 
 Cemetery "Kopciówka" - the old cemetery's headstone among other things, Elizabeth de Magnus Jelenski (Kulikowski), 1812–1879, the column commemorating the Constitution of 3 May 1791, headquarters of Polish soldiers who died in 1920, and the gate of the former monastery of the Carmelites bare. On the hill is visible church of St cemetery. Elijah. The cemetery overlooks the council Birth of the Virgin (the former church of the Discalced Carmelites).
 Jewish Cemetery

Notable people
Pavel Sukhoi, Soviet aircraft designer
Tadeusz Dołęga-Mostowicz, Polish writer, novelist, screenwriter
Jazep Drazdovič, painter, lived and taught in Hlybokaye for several years
Klawdziy Duzh-Dushewski (1891 – 1959), Belarusian civil engineer, architect, diplomat and journalist, creator of the white-red-white flag of Belarus in 1917

Twin towns – sister cities

 Daugavpils (municipality), Latvia
 Kiryat Bialik, Israel
 Ludza, Latvia
 Preiļi, Latvia
 Rawicz, Poland
 Švenčionys, Lithuania
 Telavi, Georgia
 Utena, Lithuania
 Viļāni, Latvia

References

Further reading 
 Despite Everything...I had Won by Michael Etkin, published in Israel, in 2007 
 http://www.jewishgen.org/Belarus/newsletter/Etkin%20for%20website%202.html

External links
 
 Memorial Book (Yiddish)
 Book on Jews of Gluboke/Globoke/Hlybokaye
 Photos at Radizma
 Post codes

Towns in Belarus
Populated places in Vitebsk Region
Polotsk Voivodeship
Disnensky Uyezd
Wilno Voivodeship (1926–1939)
Holocaust locations in Belarus
Soviet World War II crimes
Massacres committed by the Soviet Union
Mass murder in 1941